Earl H. Smith (June 8, 1909 – June 15, 1987) was a Republican member of the Pennsylvania House of Representatives.

References

Republican Party members of the Pennsylvania House of Representatives
1987 deaths
1909 births
20th-century American politicians